Bryan Fustukian (born October 12, 1937 Saint Boniface, Winnipeg) is a Canadian country music singer and songwriter.  He is also notable as a former radio broadcaster and concert promoter. Under the stage name of Vik Armen, Fustukian initially developed his music career in pop music.  He continues to perform and record country music as Bryan Fustukian and pop music as Vik Armen.

History

Bryan Fustukian was born in Winnipeg, Manitoba, and spent his childhood in Edmonton, Alberta.  Fustukian's first career was in radio.  After appearing as a guest singer at an Edmonton all-night radio show, he was encouraged to become a radio broadcaster and to choose a new name to do so.  He became Vik Armen.

Under the name Vik Armen, Fustukian was a radio station disc jockey in Winnipeg (CKRC), Edmonton (CHED and CJCA), Lethbridge (CHEC), Ottawa (CKOY), Toronto (CKEY) and Providence, Rhode Island.

As Vik Armen, Fustukian released a number of pop music singles in the 1960s.  He would record his songs in the radio station studios where he was employed.  One of his songs, "I'm Not In Your Dreams Anymore", released as "Not In Your Dreams" and recorded while he was a morning disc jockey at CJCA in Edmonton, became a number 1 local hit.  The single was issued by Remlap Records, an independent label co-owned by Fustukian and a partner, who worked for Decca Records.  Subsequent singles were released on Apex Records, which was then the Canadian label for Decca Records.  One such release was "Kiss Me Quick", which was produced by Norman Petty in Clovis, New Mexico, backed by Wes Dakus and The Rebels.

In 1965,  Fustukian moved to WPRO in Providence, Rhode Island, eventually becoming the music director at that station. During his tenure at WPRO, Fustukian was voted in Downbeat Magazine, for two consecutive years, as the most influential disc jockey on the Eastern Seaboard.  Fustukian became a concert promoter, in addition to his radio association. Concerts produced by Fustukian included performances by Jimi Hendrix, Cream, Al Martino, Buck Owens, The Who,  Blood, Sweat and Tears, The Rascals, Vanilla Fudge, The Mothers of Invention and Van Morrison.  Among Fustukian's notable productions was the last live concert of Cream performed in North America, prior to the breakup of the band.  Fustukian also produced and managed certain local artists during this period, working in part with New York producer Warren Schatz.

Fustukian initially left radio work in 1970, to devote himself exclusively to his music career. Fustukian returned to Canada in 1972, settling in Edmonton and recommencing his radio associations.  During this period, he was associated with Edmonton radio stations CFRN, CKUA and CJAX-FM.  Fustukian also commenced playing country music regularly, throughout Alberta.  As of the mid-1970s, Billy Cowsill, formerly of The Cowsills, joined Fustukian's band as a guitarist and co-lead singer. Cowsill's childhood had been spent in Rhode Island, where Fustukian was a well-known radio personality.  The two reconnected in Canada, where Cowsill chose to spend the majority of his life, and developed the balance of his career in music.  It was also during this period that Fustukian signed with Jim Reeves Enterprises, as a songwriter and producer.  In 1976, one of Fustukian's songs, released under the title "Singin' Lonesome Cowboy Songs", was released by Nashville recording artist George Kent.

Fustukian released his first album, Fustukian, in 1979, on Vera Cruz Records.  The album was co-produced by Bryan Fustukian and Wes Dakus.  He had previously released a single "Phyllis (Wait for the Wagon)", on Casino Records which had been a top 20 RPM single in 1976, and which was included on his 1979 album debut.

As of 1981, Fustukian commenced appearing in various films.

In 1999, Fustukian commenced performing again as Vik Armen, releasing Vik Armen Sings Again, as well as Vik Armen 1963-1967, his collected singles from the 1960s.

Subsequent to his radio career and in addition to his songwriting, performing and music production, Fustukian became the president of a voice over production studio, based in Edmonton.

Discography

As Bryan Fustukian

Albums

How the West Was Won (Fustukian and The Albertans) Dynasty, 2012
Fustukian 2010
A Fustukian Christmas 2008
Road Work
Fustukian 1973-1993
Railroad Songs and Songs of The West
Live at the Cook County Saloon (Fustukian and The Battle River Band)
Always Battle River, 1980
Fustukian Vera Cruz, 1979

Singles

As Vik Armen

Albums

It's A Lonesome Old Town(HYE)
Vik Armen 2010 (HYE)
A Tribute to Tin Pan Alley(HYE)
Vik Armen Sings Again (HYE), 1999
Vik Armen 1963-1967 (HYE)

Singles

It Takes A Lot Of Work, AirPlay Direct, 2014 
The Girl Who Never Smiled/Don't Wait 'Til Summer Comes Around(WPN).
Kiss Me Quick/When My Little Girl Is Smiling Apex, 1964
Really Terrific/Last Summer Apex, 1963
Not In Your Dreams/Without Your Love Remlap, 1963

Filmography
1981 - Silence of the North
1984 - Isaac Littlefeathers 
1984 - Draw! (TV Movie) 
1985 - Birds of Prey 
1986 - Loyalties
1987 - The Gunfighters (TV Movie)
1994 - Road to Saddle River  
1994 - Lonesome Dove: The Series (TV Series.  Episode:  "Ballad of a Gunfighter")

References

External links
  as Fustukian
  as Bryan Fustukian
  as Vik Armen
 

Musicians from Winnipeg
People from Saint Boniface, Winnipeg
Canadian country singer-songwriters
Living people
1937 births